Madre de Dios is Dozer's second album, released March 6, 2001 on Man's Ruin Records.  All songs were recorded in March 2000 at the Rockhouse Studio in Borlänge, Sweden, except "Octanoid" which was recorded in August 2000.  All songs were mixed and produced by Dozer with Bengt Backe.

Track listing
"Let The Shit Roll"  - 2:43
"Freeloader"  - 4:15
"Soulshigh"  - 4:21
"Octanoid"  - 3:28
"Earth Yeti"  - 3:24
"Full Circle"  - 4:59
"Mono Impact"  - 2:29
"Early Grace"  - 4:49
"TX-9"  - 5:38
"Thunderbolt"  - 3:28

Personnel 

 Fredrik Nordin (vocals, Rhythm Guitar)
 Tommi Holappa (Lead Guitar)
 Johan Rockner (Bass guitar)
 Erik Bäckwall (drums)
 Daniel Linden (Congas on "Earth Yeti")

References

Dozer albums
2001 albums
Man's Ruin Records albums